Pinhalzinho is a municipality in the state of São Paulo in Brazil. The population is 15,388 (2020 est.) in an area of 155 km². The elevation is 910 m.

References

Municipalities in São Paulo (state)